Events from the year 1948 in the United States.

Incumbents

Federal Government 
 President: Harry S. Truman (D–Missouri)
 Vice President: vacant
 Chief Justice: Fred M. Vinson (Kentucky)
 Speaker of the House of Representatives: Joseph William Martin, Jr. (R–Massachusetts)
 Senate Majority Leader: Wallace H. White, Jr. (R–Maine)
 Congress: 80th

Events

January
 January 17 – The latest New Jersey State Constitution goes into effect.
 January 29 – Plane crash at Los Gatos Creek, California kills 4 US citizens and 28 deportees, commemorated in a song by Woody Guthrie.

February
 February 1 – The Soviet Union begins to jam Voice of America broadcasts.
 February 21 – The stock car racing organization NASCAR is founded by Bill France Sr. with other drivers meeting at the Streamline Hotel, Daytona Beach, Florida.

March

 March 8 – McCollum v. Board of Education: The United States Supreme Court rules that religious instruction in public schools violates the U.S. Constitution.
 March 17 – The Hells Angels motorcycle gang is founded in California.
 March 20:
 Renowned Italian conductor Arturo Toscanini makes his television debut, conducting the NBC Symphony Orchestra in an all-Wagner program.
 The 20th Academy Awards ceremony, hosted by Agnes Moorehead and Dick Powell, is held at Shrine Auditorium in Los Angeles. Elia Kazan's Gentleman's Agreement receives the most nominations with eight and ties with George Seaton's Miracle on 34th Street in winning the most awards with three, including Best Motion Picture and Best Director for Kazan.

April
 April 3:
President Harry Truman signs the Marshall Plan, which authorizes $15 billion in aid for 16 countries.
Ludwig van Beethoven's Ninth Symphony is played on television in its entirety for the first time, in a concert featuring Arturo Toscanini conducting the NBC Symphony Orchestra. The chorus is conducted by Robert Shaw.
 April 19 – The ABC television network begins broadcasting.
 April 22 – WTVR begins television services. WTVR is the first TV station south of Washington D.C., giving it the nickname "The South's First Television station".
 April 30 – 21 American countries sign the Charter of the Organization of American States establishing the Organization of American States (in effect December 1, 1951).

May
 May 14 – The United States recognizes Israel as a country.
 May 19 – Mundt–Nixon Bill of 1948 passes the House (but soon after fails to reach a Senate vote. In 1950, the Mundt–Ferguson Communist Registration Bill also fails to pass both chambers–but many parts go into the McCarran Internal Security Act, which passed in 1950)
 May 26 – The U.S. Congress passes Public Law 557, which permanently establishes the Civil Air Patrol as the auxiliary of the United States Air Force.
 May 27 – Walt Disney Productions' tenth feature film, Melody Time, is released. It is Disney's fifth of six package films to be released through the 1940s.
 May 30 – A dike along the Columbia River breaks, obliterating Vanport, Oregon within minutes: 15 people die and tens of thousands are left homeless.

June

 June 3 – The Palomar Observatory telescope is finished in California.
 June 11 – The first monkey astronaut, Albert I, is launched into space from White Sands, New Mexico.
 June 12:
MCWR renamed Women Marines.
Women in the Air Force (WAF) created.
 June 17 – A Douglas DC-6 carrying United Air Lines Flight 624 crashes near Mount Carmel, Pennsylvania, killing all 43 people on board.
 June 20 – The U.S. Congress recesses for the remainder of 1948, after an overtime session closes at 7:00 a.m. D.C. time (to be shortly interrupted by Truman's recall from Congressional recess for July 20, 1948).
 June 21–25 – 1948 Republican National Convention (Philadelphia)
 June 24 – The Berlin Blockade begins; in response, the U.S. orders the launch of Operation Vittles, the U.S. action of the Berlin Airlift.
 June 28 – David Lean's Oliver Twist, based on Charles Dickens's famous novel, premieres in the UK. It is banned for 3 years in the U.S. because of alleged anti-Semitism in depicting master criminal Fagin, played by Alec Guinness.

July

 July 12–14 – 1948 Democratic National Convention (Philadelphia)
 July 17 – Dixiecrat National Convention (Birmingham)
 July 20 – Cold War: President Harry S. Truman issues the second peacetime military draft in the United States, amid increasing tensions with the Soviet Union (the first peacetime draft occurred in 1940 under President Roosevelt).
 July 23–25 – 1948 Progressive National Convention (Philadelphia)
 July 26: 
U.S. President Truman signs Executive Order 9981, ending racial segregation in the United States Armed Forces.
Turnip Day Session – Truman exhorts 80th United States Congress to pass legislation
 July 31:
 At Idlewild Field in New York City, New York International Airport (later renamed John F. Kennedy International Airport) is dedicated.
 Elizabeth Bentley testifies before HUAC

August

 August 1 – The U.S. Air Force Office of Special Investigations is founded.
 August 3 – In an appearance before the House Committee on Un-American Activities (HUAC), Whittaker Chambers, a senior editor at Time magazine and a former Communist, accuses Alger Hiss of having been a member of "an underground organization of the United States Communist Party".
 August 25 – The House Un-American Activities Committee holds its first-ever televised congressional hearing, featuring "Confrontation Day" between Whittaker Chambers and Alger Hiss.

September
 September 29 – Laurence Olivier's Hamlet opens in the United States.

October
 October 1 – National Guard Bureau made a Bureau of the Depart. of the United States Army and an Agency of the Dept. of the Air Force.
 October 8 – WMAQ-TV first airs in Chicago.
 October 11 – The Cleveland Indians defeat the Boston Braves to win the World Series, 4 games to 2.
 October 16 – The 57th Street Art Fair, the oldest juried art fair in the American Midwest, is founded.
 October 26 – Killer smog settles into Donora, Pennsylvania.

November
 November 2 – 1948 United States presidential election: Democratic incumbent Harry S. Truman defeats Republican Thomas E. Dewey and 'Dixiecrat' Strom Thurmond.

December
 December 4 – The 6.3  Desert Hot Springs earthquake affected Southern California with a maximum Mercalli intensity of VII (Very strong), causing minor damage and several injuries.
 December 10 – The Universal Declaration of Human Rights (UDHR) is adopted by the United Nations General Assembly at the Palais de Chaillot in Paris.
 December 15 – The United States Department of Justice indicts Alger Hiss on two counts of perjury.

Undated
 The Fresh Kills Landfill, the world's largest, opens in Staten Island, New York.
 The first of the Kinsey Reports, Sexual Behavior in the Human Male, is published.
 Charles Lazarus starts Children's Supermart, the predecessor of Toys "R" Us, in Washington, D.C. as a baby-furniture retailer.

Ongoing
 Cold War (1947–1991)
 Second Red Scare (1947–1957)
 Marshall Plan (1948–1951)

Births

January

 January 1 – Joe Petagno, American illustrator
 January 2 
 Joyce Wadler, American journalist and author
 Judith Miller, American journalist and author
 January 5 – Ted Lange, African-American actor, director (The Love Boat)
 January 7 – Kenny Loggins, American rock singer 
 January 10
 Donald Fagen, American rock keyboardist (Steely Dan)
 Teresa Graves, African-American actress and comedian (Get Christie Love) (d. 2002)
 January 11 – Larry Harvey, American co-founder of Burning Man (d. 2018)
 January 14
 T Bone Burnett, American record producer, musician
 John Lescroart, American author and screenwriter
 Carl Weathers, African-American actor, football player (Rocky IV, Action Jackson)
 January 15 – Ronnie Van Zant, American rock musician (Lynyrd Skynyrd) (d. 1977)
 January 16 – John Carpenter, American film director, producer, screenwriter and composer
 January 18 – M. C. Gainey, American actor
 January 20 – Jerry L. Ross, United States Air Force Officer, engineer and NASA Astronaut
 January 22 – Gilbert Levine, American conductor
 January 23
 Katharine Holabird, American writer
 Anita Pointer, American singer-songwriter (The Pointer Sisters) (d. 2022)
 January 24 – Elliott Abrams, American attorney and conservative policy analyst
 January 28 – Charles Strum, American journalist and author (d. 2021)
 January 31 – Paul Jabara, American actor, singer and songwriter (d. 1992)

February

 February 1 – Rick James, African-American urban singer, songwriter, multi-instrumentalist, and record producer (d. 2004)
 February 2 – Ina Garten, American cooking author
 February 4
 Alice Cooper, American hard rock singer and musician
 Rod Grams, American politician (d. 2013)
 February 5
 Christopher Guest, American actor, screenwriter, director and composer
 Herbie Herbert, American music manager (d. 2021)
 Barbara Hershey, American actress (Beaches)
 February 7 – Jimmy Greenspoon, American singer-songwriter and keyboard player (Three Dog Night) (d. 2015)
 February 8 – Dan Seals, American musician (d. 2009)
 February 9 – Greg Stafford, American game designer, publisher (d. 2018)
 February 10 – John Gamble, American baseball player (d. 2022)
 February 11 – Chris Rush, American stand-up comedian
 February 12 – Raymond Kurzweil, American inventor, author
 February 13 – Kitten Natividad, Mexican-American film actress
 February 14
 Jackie Martling, American comedian, radio personality
 Raymond Teller, American illusionist and magician, one half of the duo Penn & Teller
 February 15
 Ron Cey, American baseball player and sportscaster
 Larry DiTillio, American film and TV series writer (d. 2019)
 Tino Insana, American actor, producer, writer, voice artist, and comedian (d. 2017)
 February 17 – Rick Majerus, basketball player and coach (d. 2012)
 February 20 – Jennifer O'Neill, American model, actress
 February 22
 John Ashton, American actor
 Leslie H. Sabo Jr., American Medal of Honor recipient (d. 1970)
 February 28
 Steven Chu, American physicist, Nobel Prize laureate
 Mike Figgis, American director, screenwriter and composer
 Bernadette Peters, American actress, singer
 Mercedes Ruehl, American actress
 February 29
 Ken Foree, American actor
 Henry Small, American-born Canadian singer

March

 March 2 – R. T. Crowley, American pioneer of electronic commerce
 March 3 – Steve Wilhite, American computer scientist  (d. 2022)
 March 4
 James Ellroy, American writer
 Tom Grieve, American baseball player
 Leron Lee, American baseball player
 Brian Cummings, American voice actor
 March 5 – Leslie Marmon Silko, Native American author
 March 6 – Anna Maria Horsford, African-American actress
 March 9 – Jeffrey Osborne, African-American singer (On the Wings of Love)
 March 11 – Kent Conrad, American politician
 March 12 – James Taylor, American singer, songwriter (Fire and Rain)
 March 14
 Tom Coburn, American politician
 Billy Crystal, American actor, comedian
 March 17 – William Gibson, American/Canadian writer
 March 20 – John de Lancie, American actor
 March 22 – Wolf Blitzer, American television journalist (CNN)
 March 25 – Bonnie Bedelia, American actress
 March 26 – Steven Tyler, American rock singer, songwriter (Aerosmith)
 March 28
 Jayne Ann Krentz, American novelist
 Dianne Wiest, American actress
 March 29 
 Mike Heideman, American basketball coach (d. 2018)
 Bud Cort, American actor (Harold and Maude)
 March 31
 Al Gore, American politician, 45th Vice President of the United States from 1993 to 2001
 Rhea Perlman, American actress (Cheers)

April

 April 2 – Bob Lienhard, American basketball player (d. 2018) 
 April 4 
 Squire Parsons, American gospel singer, songwriter
 Dan Simmons, American fantasy, science fiction author
 Berry Oakley, American musician (d. 1972)
 April 5 – Neil Portnow, American President of The Recording Academy (NARAS)
 April 7 – John Oates, American rock singer, guitarist (Hall & Oates)
 April 12 – Don Fernando, American pornographic film actor, director
 April 15 – Michael Kamen, American composer (d. 2003)
 April 20 – Paul Milgrom, American economist, Nobel Prize laureate
 April 21 – Paul Davis, American singer, songwriter (Cool Night) (d. 2008)
 April 27 
 Frank Abagnale, American con man, imposter
 Si Robertson, American reality star, preacher, hunter, outdoorsman, and U.S. Army veteran
 April 28 – Marcia Strassman, American actress, singer (Welcome Back, Kotter) (d. 2014)

May

 May 2 – Larry Gatlin, American singer, songwriter
 May 3
 William H. Miller, American maritime historian 
 Chris Mulkey, American actor
 May 4 – Tanya Falan, American singer
 May 5
 Joe Esposito, American singer, songwriter
 Richard Pacheco, American pornographic actor
 May 8 – Steve Braun, American baseball player and coach
 May 9
 Steven W. Mosher, American social scientist, author
 Calvin Murphy, American basketball player, analyst
 May 12 – Lindsay Crouse, American actress
 May 17
 Penny DeHaven, American country singer (d. 2014)
 Jim Gardner, American journalist
 May 18
 Olivia Harrison, American author and film producer
 Tom Udall, American politician
 May 21 – D'Jamin Bartlett, American musical theatre actress
 May 26 – Stevie Nicks, American singer-songwriter (Fleetwood Mac)

June

 June 1
 Powers Boothe, American actor (d. 2017)
 Chris Madden, American interior designer (d. 2022)
 Tom Sneva, American race car driver and sportscaster
 June 2
 Jerry Mathers, American actor
 Jack Pierce, American baseball player and coach (d. 2012)
 June 4 – David Haskell,  American actor (d. 2000)
 June 9 – Gary Thorne, American play-by-play announcer
 June 11 – Dave Cash, American baseball player
 June 14 – Laurence Yep, American author
 June 19 – Phylicia Rashad, African-American actress (The Cosby Show)
 June 21 – Greg Hyder, American professional basketball player
 June 22
 Sue Roberts, American professional golfer
 Todd Rundgren, American rock singer, record producer (Hello It's Me)
 Curtis Johnson, American football cornerback 
 June 23
 Larry Coker, American football player, coach
 Jim Heacock, American defensive coordinator
 Luther Kent, American blues singer
 Clarence Thomas, African-American Associate Justice of the Supreme Court of the United States
 June 25
 Kenn George, American businessman
 Michael Lembeck, American actor, television and film director
 June 27 – Camile Baudoin, American rock guitarist
 June 28 – Kathy Bates, American actress
 June 29 – Fred Grandy, American actor, politician
 June 30 – Raymond Leo Burke, American cardinal, prelate

July

 July 5
 Tony DeMeo, American football coach, player
 Dave Lemonds, American baseball player
 July 6
 Jeff Webb, American professional basketball player
 Sid Smith, American football offensive lineman
 July 7 – Jerry Sherk, American football defensive tackle
 July 10 – Rich Hand, American professional baseball player
 July 12 
 Ben Burtt, American movie sound designer
 Richard Simmons, American television personality, fitness expert
 Jay Thomas, American actor (d. 2017)
 July 13 – Daphne Maxwell Reid, African-American actress
 July 14 – Tom Latham, American politician
 July 16 – Jeff Van Wagenen, American professional golfer
 July 17 – Doug Berry, American-Canadian football coach
 July 20 – Muse Watson, American actor
 July 21
 Ed Hinton, American sportswriter 
 Garry Trudeau, American cartoonist (Doonesbury)
 July 22 – Susan Eloise Hinton, American author
 July 25 
 Tony Cline, American football player (d. 2018)
 Steve Goodman, American Grammy Award-winning folk music singer, songwriter (d. 1984)
 July 27 – Peggy Fleming, American figure skater
 July 28
 Gerald Casale, American director, singer (Devo)
 Georgia Engel, American actress (d. 2019)
 Sally Struthers, American actress, spokeswoman (All in the Family)

August

 August 2 – Dennis Prager, American radio talk show host, author
 August 7 – James P. Allison, American immunologist, recipient of the Nobel Prize in Physiology or Medicine in 2018
 August 13 – Kathleen Battle, African-American soprano
 August 17 – Edward Lazear, American economist (d. 2020)
 August 19
 Tipper Gore, Second Lady of the United States as wife of Al Gore
 Elliot Lurie, singer-songwriter and guitarist
 Gerald McRaney, actor, director, and producer
 Deana Martin, American singer and actress
 August 20 – Barbara Allen Rainey (b. Barbara Ann Allen), American aviator, first female pilot in the U.S. armed forces (d. 1982)
 August 21 – John Ellis, American baseball player  (d. 2022)
 August 22 – Bishop Bullwinkle, pastor (d. 2019)
 August 27 – Sgt. Slaughter, American professional wrestler
 August 30 
 Lewis Black, American comedian
 Fred Hampton, African-American activist (d. 1969)
 August 31 – Cyril Jordan, American musician

September

 September 1 – James Rebhorn, American actor (d. 2014)
 September 2
 Nate Archibald, American basketball player
 Terry Bradshaw, American football player, sportscaster
 Christa McAuliffe, American teacher, astronaut (Challenger Disaster) (d. 1986)
 September 3 – Don Brewer, American drummer (Grand Funk Railroad)
 September 4 – Michael Berryman, American actor
 September 7 – Susan Blakely, American actress
 September 10
 Bob Lanier, American basketball player (d. 2022)
 Mike McCoy, American businessman (d. 2021)
 Ted Poe, American politician
 Charlie Waters, American football player
 September 13 – Nell Carter, African-American singer, actress (Gimme a Break!) (d. 2003)
 September 16 – Ron Blair, American bassist (Tom Petty and the Heartbreakers)
 September 17 – John Ritter, American actor and comedian (d. 2003)
 September 18
 Lynn Abbey, computer programmer and author
 Ken Brett, baseball player, coach, and manager (d. 2003)
 September 20 – George R. R. Martin, American novelist and short-story writer
 September 22 – Jim Byrnes, American voice actor, blues musician and actor
 September 27 – A Martinez, American actor, singer
 September 29
 Mark Farner, American rock guitarist, singer (Grand Funk Railroad)
 Bryant Gumbel, African-American television broadcaster (The Today Show)

October

 October 1 – Mark Landon, actor (d. 2009)
 October 2
 Avery Brooks, actor, musician
 Chris LeDoux, singer, rodeo star (d. 2005)
 Donna Karan, fashion designer
 October 4 – Meg Bennett, soap opera writer
 October 5
 Carter Cornelius, singer (d. 1991)
 Russell Mael, vocalist 
 Tawl Ross, guitarist 
 October 7 – Diane Ackerman, poet and essayist
 October 8 – Johnny Ramone, guitarist (Ramones) (d. 2004)
 October 9 – Jackson Browne, rock musician ("Running on Empty")
 October 11
 Margie Alexander, gospel, soul singer (d. 2013)
 Cynthia Clawson, gospel singer
 October 13 – John Ford Coley, rock musician ("I'd Really Love to See You Tonight")
 October 14 – David Ruprecht, actor, writer (Supermarket Sweep)
 October 16 
 Leo Mazzone, baseball coach
 André Leon Talley, fashion journalist (d. 2022)
 October 17
 Robert Jordan, novelist (d. 2007)
 Margot Kidder, Canadian-American actress, director, and activist (d. 2018)
 George Wendt, actor (Cheers)
 October 18 – Ntozake Shange, African-American playwright, poet (d. 2018)
 October 19 – Patrick Simmons, American musician (The Doobie Brothers)
 October 21
 Tom Everett, actor
 Allen Vigneron, Roman Catholic Archbishop of Detroit
 October 22
 Lynette Fromme, would-be assassin of President Gerald Ford
 Debbie Macomber, author
 October 25
 Dave Cowens, basketball player and coach
 Dan Gable, wrestler, coach
 October 26 – Toby Harrah, baseball player
 October 28 – Telma Hopkins, African-American actress, singer (Tony Orlando and Dawn)
 October 29 – Kate Jackson, actress (Charlie's Angels)

November

 November 1 – Anna Stuart, American actress
 November 5
 Charles Bradley, African-American singer (d. 2017)
 Bob Barr, American politician
 Dallas Holm, American Christian musician 
 William Daniel Phillips, American physicist, Nobel Prize laureate
 November 6 – Glenn Frey, American guitarist, singer (The Eagles) (d. 2016)
 November 7 – Jim Houghton, American actor, director
 November 9 – Kelly Harmon, American actress and model
 November 10 – Vincent Schiavelli, American actor (d. 2005)
 November 12
 Skip Campbell, American politician (d. 2018)
 Cliff Harris, American football player
 Richard Roberts, evangelist, son of Oral Roberts
 November 14
 Robert Ginty, American actor, director (d. 2009)
 Dee Wallace, American actress
 November 16 – Chi Coltrane, American musician (Thunder and Lightning)
 November 17 – Howard Dean, American politician
 November 18
 Andrea Marcovicci, actress and singer
 Jack Tatum, American football player (d. 2010)
 November 20
 Harlee McBride, American actress
 John R. Bolton, U.S. Ambassador to the U.N., National Security Advisor
 Barbara Hendricks, American singer 
 Richard Masur, American actor, director and president of the Screen Actors Guild
 November 21 – Alphonse Mouzon, American jazz drummer (d. 2016)
 November 23 – Ron Bouchard, American NASCAR driver (d. 2015)
 November 24 – Joe Howard, American actor
 November 26 – Gayle McCormick, American singer (Smith) (d. 2016)

December

 December 2 – T. Coraghessan Boyle, American writer
 December 3 – Rick Cua, American singer, evangelist
 December 6
 Don Nickles, American politician
 JoBeth Williams, American actress, director
 December 7
 Gary Morris, American country singer, actor
 Tony Thomas, American television producer
 December 9 – Gray H. Miller, Senior United States District Judge of the United States District Court for the Southern District of Texas
 December 11 – Chester Thompson, American rock drummer
 December 12 – David K. Karnes, American politician
 December 13 – Ted Nugent, American musician, singer, songwriter and political activist
 December 16 – Pat Quinn, American lawyer and politician, 41st governor of Illinois
 December 18 – Edmund Kemper, American serial killer
 December 21 – Samuel L. Jackson, American actor and producer
 December 22
 Flip Mark, American child actor
 Lynne Thigpen, African-American actress (Godspell) (d. 2003)
 December 23 – Jim Ferguson, American guitarist, composer, educator, author and music journalist
 December 25 – Barbara Mandrell, American country singer, musician, and actress
 December 27 – Ronnie Caldwell, American soul music, rhythm and blues musician (d. 1967)
 December 28 – Mary Weiss, American singer (The Shangri-Las)
 December 31
 Joe Dallesandro, American model, actor
 Donna Summer, African-American singer, actress (Love to Love You Baby) (d. 2012)

Undated
 Paul Siegfried – American attorney

Deaths
 January 1 – Edna May, actress (born 1878)
 January 5 – Mary Dimmick Harrison, wife of President Benjamin Harrison (born 1858)
 January 7 – Charles C. Wilson, actor (born 1894)
 January 9 – Alvah Curtis Roebuck, businessman, co-founder of Sears, Roebuck (born 1864)
 January 12 – Herbert Allen Farmer, criminal (born 1891)
 January 24 – Bill Cody, actor (born 1891)
 January 28 – Anna Maria Gove, physician (b. 1867)
 January 30 – Orville Wright, pioneer aviator (born 1871)
 February 8 –  Samuel P. Bush, businessman and industrialist (born 1863)
 March 10 –  Zelda Fitzgerald, novelist and socialite,  wife of F. Scott Fitzgerald (born 1900)
 April 5 –  Angelo Joseph Rossi, Mayor of San Francisco (born 1878)
 June 2 –  William C. Lee, general (born 1895)
 July 4 – Albert Bates, criminal (born 1893)
 July 5
 Charles Fillmore, Protestant mystic (born 1854)
 Carole Landis, film actress (born 1919)
 July 9 – James Baskett, African-American actor (Uncle Remus in Disney's Song of the South) (born 1904)
 July 11 – Franz Weidenreich, anatomist (born 1873 in Germany)
 July 23 - D. W. Griffith, film director (born 1875)
 July 31 - Lucy Mercer Rutherfurd, mistress of Franklin D. Roosevelt (born 1891)
 August 16 – Babe Ruth, baseball player (born 1895)
 August 17 – Mariette Rheiner Garner, Second Lady of the United States as wife of John Nance Garner (born 1869)
 August 27 – Charles Evans Hughes, 11th Chief Justice of the Supreme Court (born 1862)
 August 30 — Alice Salomon, German-American social reformer (born 1872)

 September 30 – Edith Roosevelt, First Lady of the United States and Second Lady of the United States as wife of Theodore Roosevelt (born 1861)
 November 24 – Anna Jarvis, social activist (born 1864)

See also
 List of American films of 1948
 Timeline of United States history (1930–1949)

References

External links
 

 
1940s in the United States
United States
United States
Years of the 20th century in the United States